Khwadāy-Nāmag was a Middle Persian history from  the Sasanian era. Now lost, it was imagined by Theodor Nöldeke to be the common ancestor of all later Persian-language histories of the Sasanian Empire, a view which has recently been disproven. It was supposed to have been first translated into Arabic by Ibn al-Muqaffa' (d. 757), who had access to Sasanian court documents. According to Nöldeke's theory, the book itself was composed first under the reign of Khosrow I Anushirvan, and redacted in the reign of the last Sasanian monarch, Yazdegerd III. Khwaday-Namag was the primary source of the 10th-century Persian epic Shahnameh ('Book of Kings') written by Ferdowsi. Khwaday-Namag was also translated to New Persian, and was expanded using other sources, by Samanid scholars under the supervision of Abu Mansur Mamari in 957, but only the introduction of this work remains today.

Although the Arabic Nihayat al-arab presents itself as partially derived from Ibn al-Muqaffa's translation of the Khwadāy-Nāmag, only a small amount of its material may reasonably be traced back to the lost Persian work.

References

Sources
 
 
 
 

Lost books
Middle Persian
History of the Sasanian Empire
Iranian books
History books about Iran
Persian words and phrases
Khosrow I
Culture of the Sasanian Empire